The Japanese women's national under 18 ice hockey team is the national under-18 ice hockey team of Japan. The team represents Japan at the International Ice Hockey Federation's U18 Women's World Championship and other international tournaments and events.

U18 Women's World Championship record

*Includes two losses in extra time (in the preliminary round)
^Includes one win in extra time (in the preliminary round)
**Includes one loss in extra time (in the relegation round)

References

 

Women's national under-18 ice hockey teams
Ice hockey